This is a list of diplomatic missions of Peru, excluding honorary consulates.

Current missions

Africa

Americas

Asia

Europe

Oceania

Multilateral organizations

Gallery

Closed missions

Africa

Americas

Asia

Europe

Non-resident embassies (still unverified)
Location of residences are in parentheses

 (New Delhi)
 (New Delhi)
 (Accra)
 (Accra)

See also
Foreign relations of Peru
List of diplomatic missions in Peru
Visa policy of Peru

Notes

References

External links

Peruvian Ministry of Foreign Affairs

Peru
Diplomatic missions